The Idaho Hot Springs Mountain Bike Route is an off-road bicycle touring route in central Idaho. Developed by Adventure Cycling Association, the route consists of 518 miles of mostly dirt roads and 227 miles of optional singletrack, with access to more than 50 hot springs.

Route 
The main route is a loop through the towns of Featherville, Ketchum, Stanley, McCall, Cascade, Crouch, and Idaho City, with an optional spur to Boise. The main route is bidirectional, but the singletrack routes are only mapped counterclockwise.

Terrain 
Notable highlights on the route include the Sawtooth Mountains, the White Cloud Mountains, the Boise Mountains, the Salmon River, and the Sawtooth, Salmon-Challis, Boise, and Payette National Forests. The route also takes the riders near several wilderness areas, including the Hemingway-Boulder, the Sawtooth, the Frank Church River of No Return, and the Cecil D. Andrus–White Clouds Wilderness, which effectively bars cyclists from the White Cloud singletrack option.

Riding the Idaho Hot Springs Mountain Bike Route 
Most people ride the route counterclockwise with typical times to complete it ranging from 2 to 3 weeks. Due to the mountainous terrain and the unpredictable central Idaho weather, the riding season generally runs from May after the roads are free of snow to October when the snow flies again. Early season high water from snow runoff may affect accessibility of the hot springs located adjacent to the rivers.

Consideration should be given to Idaho’s fire season in August and September. The US Forest Service website provides daily updates on current fire conditions and links to the National Weather Service for critical decision making information especially wind speed and direction. Depending on the time of year, temperatures may range to freezing at night to over 90 degrees F during the heat of the day.

Grizzly bears are not expected in this area but it is black bear country. Basic bear prevention practices are always a good idea, like keeping a clean campsite area and hanging food, as necessary.

Water is generally very accessible on this route and a water filter is recommended.

Generally speaking the Forest Service roads on this route are quite rough and wash-boarded.  So, a certain amount of suspension on your bike might make your ride a little less bumpy. A bicycle with 29 inch wheels and front shocks would be a good choice. Also, there is a lot of climbing on this route so obviously, lighter is better.  This is a good route for bikepacking, especially with the single track options. The new bikepacking gear is well conceived, light weight and heavy duty, and it is worth investigating before you leave on your trip.

The Adventure Cycling Association maps for this route are generally very good but adequate navigation skills and good judgement is important. Riders should be self-sufficient and carry camping equipment as commercial lodging is not always available. It is also helpful to be skilled in bike maintenance and repair.

Hot Springs 
Riders on the Idaho Hot Springs Mountain Bike Route can access the following developed hot springs as well as many natural, undeveloped hot springs:
 Baumgartner Hot Springs
 Easley Hot Springs
 Burgdorf Hot Springs
 Gold Fork Hot Springs
 Silver Creek Plunge Hot Springs
 Terrace Lakes Hot Springs

References 

Bicycle tours